Pachyprotasis rapae is a species of common sawfly in the family Tenthredinidae.

References

Further reading

External links

 

Tenthredinidae
Insects described in 1767
Taxa named by Carl Linnaeus